Medjon Hoxha (born 27 July 1999) is a Kosovan professional footballer who plays as an attacking midfielder.

Club career

Kortrijk
Hoxha is the youth product of Kortrijk since 2004. On 7 April 2017, he signed his first professional contract with Belgian First Division A side Kortrijk, on a two-year contract. On 6 May 2017, Hoxha made his debut as professional footballer in a 0–3 home defeat against Roeselare after coming on as a substitute at 84th minute in place of Stijn De Smet.

Feronikeli
On 29 December 2019, Hoxha joined Football Superleague of Kosovo side Feronikeli. On 12 February 2020, he made his debut with Feronikeli in the quarter-final of 2019–20 Kosovar Cup against Liria after being named in the starting line-up.

International career
On 30 August 2018, Hoxha received a call-up from Kosovo U21 for a 2019 UEFA European Under-21 Championship qualification match against Republic of Ireland U21.

References

External links

Medjon Hoxha at the K.V. Kortrijk

1999 births
Living people
People from Hemer
Sportspeople from Arnsberg (region)
Kosovo Albanians
Kosovan footballers
Kosovo youth international footballers
Kosovo under-21 international footballers
German footballers
German people of Kosovan descent
German people of Albanian descent
Belgian footballers
Belgian people of Kosovan descent
Belgian people of Albanian descent
Association football midfielders
Belgian Pro League players
K.V. Kortrijk players
Football Superleague of Kosovo players
KF Feronikeli players
Footballers from North Rhine-Westphalia